was a Japanese manga artist. Her notable works include Yaeka no Karute, Croisée in a Foreign Labyrinth, and Gosick.

Takeda has a sister named Enaga Senno, who is an illustrator and is four years younger.

In January 2017, she died due to illness. It was made public by the entry by Kazuki Sakuraba, author of Dragon Age released on 9 May of the same year, June 2017 issue of the same day and Gosick on the same day.

Works

Illustrations

Drama CD

References

Manga artists
Year of birth unknown
2017 deaths
1978 births